The men's 100 yard freestyle was a swimming event held as part of the Swimming at the 1904 Summer Olympics programme. It was the second time the event was held at the Olympics, though the only time yards were used instead of metres. 9 swimmers from 2 nations competed. The event was won by Zoltán Halmay of Hungary, the nation's second consecutive victory in the 100 yard/metre freestyle.

Background

This was the second appearance of the men's 100 freestyle, with the distance in yards for the only time. The event has been held at every Summer Olympics except 1900 (when the shortest freestyle was the 200 metres), though the 1904 version was measured in yards rather than metres.

None of the swimmers from 1896 returned.

Both competing nations, Hungary and the United States, were making their second appearance in the event; no nations made their debut in 1904.

Competition format

The competition featured two rounds, heats and a final. The swimmers were grouped into two heats, with the top 3 in each heat (regardless of overall time) advancing to the final.

The swimming races were held in a man-made lake in the park, between a pier and some floating rafts. There was a slight current, which apparently did not greatly affect the swimmers.

Records

Prior to this competition, there was no recognized world record (first recognized in 1905) and the Olympic record was in metres.

Zoltán Halmay broke the Olympic in the first semifinal and then bettered his new record in the final.

Schedule

Results

Semifinals

The top three finishers in each heat advanced to the final. The results of the non-advancing swimmers are unclear, but Raymond Thorne, Edwin Swatek and Bill Orthwein are named by de Wael as possible competitors.

Semifinal 1

Semifinal 2

Final

Sources

 
 

Swimming at the 1904 Summer Olympics